Washington Square Mall is the name of several shopping malls:
Washington Square Mall (Evansville, Indiana)
Washington Square (Indianapolis)
Washington Square Mall (Homewood, Illinois), Homewood, Illinois (defunct)
Washington Square Mall (Detroit Lakes, Minnesota), Detroit Lakes, Minnesota
Washington Square (Oregon), Tigard, Oregon
Washington Square Mall (Germantown, Wisconsin), Germantown, Wisconsin (defunct)